Blizanci is a village in Bosnia and Herzegovina. According to the 1991 census, the village is located in the municipality of Stari Grad, Sarajevo.

References

Populated places in Stari Grad, Sarajevo